ZTV Norway was a Norwegian entertainment television channel. Its programming consisted of music videos, movies and sitcoms.

The channel was launched in Norway for the first time in 1995. It was unsuccessful, however, and it closed down in 1996.

In 2002, ZTV returned to Norway, replacing the Viasat Plus channel. The second time around it quickly established itself as popular with younger viewers, this time with a greater emphasis on music and especially Norwegian artists.

On September 8, 2007 the channel had its last broadcast, and was replaced by Viasat 4.

References

External links
Official website

Modern Times Group
Defunct television channels in Norway
Television channels and stations established in 1995
Television channels and stations established in 2002
Television channels and stations disestablished in 1996
Television channels and stations disestablished in 2007
1995 establishments in Norway
2002 establishments in Norway
1996 disestablishments in Norway
2007 disestablishments in Norway